Scott Winkler is an American Paralympic track and field athlete who competes in men's shot put.

Winkler is a United States Army veteran who was paralyzed below the chest in Tikrit, Iraq in 2003 after he fell off a truck while holding 50 pounds of ammunition.

He won a gold medal and set a new world record mark for class F54 with a throw of 10.23 metres and 1053 points while competing in the  men's shot put at the 2007 Para Pan American Games.

He also competed for Team USA at the 2008 Summer Paralympics where he placed fifth in the shot put F55/56 event.

The documentary film Warrior Champions: From Baghdad to Beijing features Winkler's individual story as he trained to try for a berth on the 2008 U.S. Paralympic team.

Scott currently still competes in throwing shot put. He also is the shotput and discus coach at Harlem High School in Harlem Georgia. All the while running a successful farm, Winkler Farms.

References

Living people
Paralympic track and field athletes of the United States
Athletes (track and field) at the 2008 Summer Paralympics
American male shot putters
Year of birth missing (living people)
Medalists at the 2007 Parapan American Games
Medalists at the 2011 Parapan American Games